The 2009 WPS Playoffs were the postseason to Women's Professional Soccer's 2009 Season, that started on August 15 and culminated on August 22 at the Home Depot Center in Carson, California.

Format
The top four WPS teams, based on their regular season finishes, qualified for the playoffs.  In the First Round, the third-ranked team hosted the fourth-ranked team.  The winner of that match advances to the Super Semifinal, where they traveled to the second-ranked team.  Finally, the regular season first-ranked team hosted the winner of the Super Semifinal in the WPS Championship match.

This format, fairly unusual in the American sports landscape, preserves the knockout-style postseason most American sports fans are familiar with, while also highly favoring the regular season first-ranked team.

Standings

Bracket

Results

First round

Super Semifinal

WPS Championship

Media coverage
Both the First Round and the WPS Championship was viewable on Fox Sports Network, while the Super Semifinal was on Fox Soccer Channel.  Also, all three matches were webcast on the WPS website.

Notes and references

See also
2009 Women's Professional Soccer season
Women's Professional Soccer

Women's Professional Soccer Playoffs, 2009